There have been four  baronetcies created for persons with the surname Gilmour, two in the Baronetage of Nova Scotia and two in the Baronetage of the United Kingdom. The former two are extinct and the latter two are extant.

The four baronetcies
The Gilmour Baronetcy, of Edinburgh, was created in the Baronetage of Nova Scotia on 16 August 1661 for Andrew Gilmour. The title became extinct on his death in 1663.

The Gilmour Baronetcy, of Craigmillar in the County of Edinburgh, was created in the Baronetage of Nova Scotia on 1 February 1678 for Alexander Gilmour. The second Baronet sat as Member of Parliament for Midlothian. The title became extinct on the death of the third Baronet in 1792.

The Gilmour Baronetcy, of Lundin and Montrave in the Parishes of Largo and Scoonie in the County of Fife, was created in the Baronetage of the United Kingdom on 1 September 1897 for John Gilmour, Chairman of the Scottish Conservative and Unionist Party. He was succeeded by his eldest son, the second Baronet. He was a prominent Conservative politician and served as Home Secretary between 1932 and 1935. His son, the third Baronet, was also a Conservative politician. As of 2014 the title is held by the latter's grandson, the fifth Baronet, who succeeded in 2013.

The family seat is Montrave, near Leven, Fife.

The Gilmour Baronetcy, of Liberton and Craigmillar in the County of Midlothian, was created in the Baronetage of the United Kingdom on 29 July 1926 for Robert Gilmour, a Brigadier-General in the British Army and Captain of the Royal Company of Archers. Born Robert Wolrige-Gordon, he assumed the surname of Gilmour on succeeding to the estates of his great-uncle Walter James Little Gilmour. The third Baronet was a Conservative politician and served as Secretary of State for Defence in 1974. In 1992 he was created a life peer as Baron Gilmour of Craigmillar, of Craigmillar in the District of the City of Edinburgh. The life peerage became extinct on his death in 2007 while he was succeeded in the baronetcy by his son, the fourth Baronet.

Gilmour baronets, of Edinburgh (1661)
Sir Andrew Gilmour, 1st Baronet (died 1663)

Gilmour baronets, of Craigmillar (1678)

Sir Alexander Gilmour, 1st Baronet (1657–1731)
Sir Charles Gilmour, 2nd Baronet (died 1750)
Sir Alexander Gilmour, 3rd Baronet (–1792)

Gilmour baronets, of Lundin and Montrave (1897)

Sir John Gilmour, 1st Baronet (1845–1920)
Sir John Gilmour, 2nd Baronet (1876–1940)
Sir John Edward Gilmour, 3rd Baronet (1912–2007)
Sir John Gilmour, 4th Baronet (1944–2013)
Sir John Nicholas Gilmour, 5th Baronet (born 1970)

The heir apparent is the present holder's only son John Edward Arif Gilmour (born 2001).

Gilmour baronets, of Liberton and Craigmillar (1926)
Sir Robert Gordon Gilmour, 1st Baronet (1857–1939)
Sir John Little Gilmour, 2nd Baronet (1899–1977)
Sir Ian Hedworth John Little Gilmour, 3rd Baronet (1926–2007) (created Baron Gilmour of Craigmillar in 1992)
Sir David Robert Gilmour, 4th Baronet (born 1952)

The heir apparent is the present holder's only son Alexander Ian Michael Gilmour (born 1980).

Notes

References
Kidd, Charles, Williamson, David (editors). Debrett's Peerage and Baronetage (1990 edition). New York: St Martin's Press, 1990, 

Baronetcies in the Baronetage of the United Kingdom
Extinct baronetcies in the Baronetage of Nova Scotia
1661 establishments in the British Empire